Parethelcus is a genus of beetles belonging to the family Curculionidae.

The species of this genus are found in Europe.

Species:
 Parethelcus nesicola Colonnelli, 1991 
 Parethelcus pollinarius (Forster, 1771)

References

Curculionidae
Curculionidae genera